The River Detectives were a folk rock duo from Craigneuk in Wishaw, Scotland. The duo, formed in 1985, comprised Sam Corry (vocals, guitar, harmonica) and Dan O'Neill (vocals, guitar, drums). The River Detectives have released three albums to date and had a UK top 75 hit with their song, "Chains".

History
The band played their first show at Jack Daniel's Pub in Motherwell on 18 August 1986. In 1988 the band toured extensively in Scotland and attracted the interest of the Warner Bros. Records label, becoming the first Scottish band to sign for them in over a decade. Shortly afterwards, the duo moved to Glasgow to pen the songs for their debut album, Saturday Night Sunday Morning. The album spawned the UK top 75 hit "Chains".

The band recruited Van Morrison's backing group for the follow-up album, Elvis Has Left the Building, released in 1992. The album's title is a reference to the state of music at the time of the record's release when computer technology and the rise of the DJ were rampant and conventional performers were becoming peripheral. After the album's release, the band relocated to Ireland, where they wrote and toured extensively and guested on a number of records. By 1996, after playing the Splashy Fen festival in the Natal Province, the band received further invitations to tour in the country and relocated to Durban for a year before returning to the UK in 2000 to take a break.

The duo reunited when Corry asked O'Neil for assistance in finishing lyrics to a new song, "Capetown to Glasgow". This song featured on their third release, King of the Ghost Train Ride, which was released on Neontetra Records in 2005.

The duo played a full band set at the O2 ABC in Glasgow on 28 September 2009, which they announced during the show was their farewell gig.

Discography

Albums

Singles

References

External links
 

Scottish folk music groups
Musical groups established in 1985
Musical groups disestablished in 2009
Scottish musical duos
1985 establishments in Scotland